Queer anti-urbanism is a term used within the field of queer studies to describe theoretical viewpoints which challenge the validity of the assertion that queer identity and practices are inseparable from the urban.

As described by Scott Herring, who largely popularized the term, queer anti-urbanism is "a means to critically negotiate the relentless urbanisms that often characterize any United States based 'gay imaginary'... in which the city represents a beacon of tolerance and gay community, the country a locus of persecution and gay absence." In this sense, queer anti-urbanism can be thought of as critical opposition to homonormative and metronormative—viewing city living as the natural one—ways of life.

Queer metronormativity
Jack Halberstam relates queer metronormativity to the dominant "story of migration from 'country' to 'town'... a spatial narrative within which the subject moves to a place of tolerance after enduring life in a place of suspicion, persecution, and secrecy." This narrative purports that the only means of achieving community among LGBT persons, happiness, and open existence is via an urban lifestyle, perhaps devaluing rural existence by way of stereotypes concerning urban and rural ways of life. 

Rural people are commonly depicted in media and otherwise as un-intelligent, dirty, and intolerant; these stereotypes and myths persist largely through well-publicized rural hate crimes (e.g. Brandon Teena's assault and murder) that seemingly support stereotypes of rural people as violent bigots and of rural LGBT people as mere victims. The propagation and persistence of these myths lend themselves to the assumption that rural LGBT people do not and cannot exist; those who live happily in rural areas are thus denied existence under the dominant view of metronormativity. This invisibility is evident in many media, academic, and judicial depictions of identity: for example, a television show may depict rural LGBT people living under oppression, while their urban counterparts flourish. 

The cumulative effect of the metronormative narrative and the subsequent rural invisibility is that queer rural-urban migration may become a socially-constructed compulsory act, as does adherence to the norms of metronormative/homonormative gay culture. Herring divides these norms into four categories – the narratological, the socioeconomic, the aesthetic, and the racial. In order to "properly" conform to urban society, according to Herring, one must accept the metronormative narrative, make enough money to participate in gay male consumer culture, dress the "right" way, and effectively "be white." Failing to do so seemingly confirms the myths and stereotypes that underlie a metronormative worldview; metronormativity thus perpetuates itself by encouraging rural queers to hide their origins and conform, thereby further erasing rural queer life and visibility.

Metronormativity operates upon the false dichotomy of rural and urban existence among LGBT people. It assumes that while the two existences differ from each other, there is no difference between life in different urban areas, nor any difference between LGBT life in different rural areas – since, according to metronormative LGBT society, rural LGBT life does not exist.

Critical rusticity
Queer anti-urbanism manifests in practice in a variety of ways, which Herring refers to under the umbrella term of "critical rusticity." Some examples include the rural, all-female "Lesbian Separatist" communities that consciously spurned "the city" in favor of rural alternatives to a subjugated status under metronormative, white-male-centric, upper-middle-class gay culture. Such communities contradicted the gay rural-urban migration narrative, defying the values of metronormativity and replacing them with a new value system that was simultaneously rural and queer. Publications such as Rural Fairie Digest and Country Women countered rural queer erasure, provided alternatives to gay consumer culture through 'how to's' on DIY 'country skills,' and to some extent provided a sense of rural queer community even for those who were geographically isolated. Even without associating with a larger movement, queer individuals who live rural lifestyles can defy metronormativity and challenge the definition of "queerness" simply through their existence. Asserting rural queer identity in opposition to what queer identity is "supposed to" be (i.e. urban) promotes an alternative to metronormativity, where differences in rural queer life and urban queer life are viewed not as deficiencies, but rather as value-neutral differences. More recently, scholars Julie A. Podmore and Alison L. Bain have criticized the urban-rural binary distinction at work in these approaches, pointing how this leaves out queer realities in the suburbs.

See also
Homonormativity
LGBT and rurality

References

Cultural geography
LGBT studies
Rural culture